The Sony Xperia C3 is a touchscreen-enabled Android smartphone designed, developed and manufactured by Sony Mobile Communications. Codenamed "Wukong" and the successor to Sony Xperia C, it features a Snapdragon 400 processor.

The Xperia C3 was announced on July 8, 2014, marketed as the "world's best selfie smartphone". Unlike other Sony smartphones, it has a 5MP front camera, as well as a 8MP rear camera. It was released in August 2014, starting in China and followed by other markets.

Specifications

Hardware
The Sony Xperia C3 has a 5.5-inch HD IPS display, 1.2 GHz quad core Snapdragon 400 processor, Adreno 305 GPU, 1 GB RAM, 8 GB internal storage, 8 MP rear camera and 5 MP front-facing camera.

Software

Sony Xperia C3 ships with Android 4.4.2 KitKat and is upgradable to Android 5.1 Lollipop.

References

External links

Android (operating system) devices
Sony smartphones
Mobile phones introduced in 2014
Discontinued smartphones